The Crawford River, a perennial river of the Mid-Coast Council system, is located in the Mid North Coast region of New South Wales, Australia.

Course and features
The Crawford River rises below Winns Mountain, northeast of Stroud, and flows generally east, southeast, then northeast through Myall River State Forest, before reaching its confluence with the Myall River at Bulahdelah; descending  over its  course.

See also 

 Rivers of New South Wales
 List of rivers of New South Wales (A–K)
 List of rivers of Australia

References

External links
 

Rivers of New South Wales
Mid-Coast Council
Mid North Coast